St Christopher's Church, Sneinton is a Church of England church in Sneinton Nottingham.

History
The church was built on the site of a former iron mission church and school. It was moved on rollers to make room for the building of the new church. The building was loosened from its foundations and beams fixed underneath. The structure was raised by hydraulic jacks and placed on rollers and moved  by a team of 17 men. Two weeks later the iron church was moved using the same technique. The pews, organ and fittings were left intact and the church moved .

The new church was built in the early Decorated Gothic style with two side aisles and north and south transepts. It was consecrated by Rt. Revd. Edwyn Hoskyns the Bishop of Southwell on 1 December 1910. It replaced a tin church which had been opened in 1902 on the same site. It became the main church for St Christopher's, from the original church built on Meadow Lane, near Trent Bridge in 1885, which was retained as a mission church.

The church was badly damaged in the air raid on Nottingham on 8 and 9 May 1941 (the same raid which destroyed St. John the Baptist's Church, Leenside, Nottingham nearby). Only the walls were left standing. Until restoration work was completed in 1952, the church joined with St. Philip's Church, Pennyfoot Street, and when St. Philip's Church was demolished in 1963, its name was joined with that of St. Christopher's. The original church on Meadow Lane was destroyed in the same air raid that damaged the main building.

A full history of the church can be found on the Southwell DAC Church History Project website.

Organ

The two manual pipe organ dates from the rebuilding of the church in 1953 and is by Cousans of Lincoln. The reeds were voiced by Billy Jones. A specification of the organ can be found on the National Pipe Organ Register.

References

Sneinton
Churches completed in 1910
Sneinton
Christopher